Łowkowice , German Lobkowitz is a village in the administrative district of Gmina Strzeleczki (Gemeinde Klein Strehlitz), within Krapkowice County, Opole Voivodeship, in the south-western Polish region of Upper Silesia.

Since 2006 the village, like the entire commune, has been bilingual in German and Polish.

The village has a population of 575 inhabitants.

History
The village had already invested in German town law in the early 13th century, and was first mentioned in written documents as Lofcovici in 1218. It was later named in 1534 as Lowkowitz. The name is thought to derive from the name Łowek. During the Middle Ages the town frequently changed hands, before finally in 1561 passing to the Oppersdorff family of Oberglogau. In 1936 the Nazi government renamed the village Jägershausen because of its Slavic-sounding name. Before 1945 it belonged to the district of Landkreis Neustadt O.S.

The village windmill was built in 1868 of brick, and was recently renovated by a private owner and converted into a restaurant. The town park and palace, dating to the late 19th century and built for a landowning family, are privately owned. The town chapel, also built of brick, also dates to the 19th century.

In 1945 Silesia was given to Poland and the German population of Lobkowitz was largely expelled. The village was renamed Łowkowice and annexed to the newly created Silesian Voivodeship. In 1950 it was reassigned to Opole Voivodeship, and in 1999 reassigned from Prudnik County (formerly Neustadt O.S.) to Krapkowice County. On 17 May 2006 the entire commune of Strzelecki/Klein Strehlitz was declared bilingual in German and Polish, and on 24 November 2008 the old name German name Lobkowitz was also made official.

References

Villages in Krapkowice County